This is a list of Bangladeshi films that were released in 2006.

Releases

See also

List of Bangladeshi films of 2007
List of Bangladeshi films
Dhallywood
Cinema of Bangladesh

References

External links 
 Bangladeshi films on Internet Movie Database

Films
Lists of 2006 films by country or language
 2006